Jean-Marie Bockel (born 22 June 1950) is a French politician who served as Secretary of State for Defence and Veterans in the government of Prime Minister François Fillon appointed on 18 March 2008, having previously been Secretary of State for Cooperation and La Francophonie since June 2007. He has been a member of the French National Assembly since 1981, when he stood as a Socialist Party candidate, and was Minister for Commerce in the Socialist Party government of Laurent Fabius between 1984 and 1986.

Bockel (commonly referred to as "JMB" in France) was born in Strasbourg.  He is a lawyer and has been mayor of Mulhouse since 1989. On the right wing of the Socialist Party, he declared himself to be an admirer and strong supporter of the policies of Tony Blair.

In November 2007 he announced the formation of a new centre-left political party, Modern Left (Gauche Moderne), following his resignation from the Socialist Party when joining the Sarkozy administration, and used this party as a vehicle to campaign in the municipal elections of 2008 for a fourth term as mayor.

Pierre-Emmanuel, one of his five sons, died in a helicopter crash in Mali on 25 November 2019.

Political career

Governmental functions

Secretary of State for Prisons and Prison Reform : 2009–2010.

Secretary of State for Defense and Veterans : 2008–2009.

Secretary of State for Cooperation and Francophony : 2007–2008.

Minister of Commerce, Handicrafts and Tourism : February–March 1986.

State Secretary to the Minister of Commerce, Handicrafts and Tourism : 1984–1986.

Electoral mandates

National Assembly of France

Member of the National Assembly of France for Haut-Rhin : 1981–1984 (Became secretary of State in 1984) / 1986–1993 / 1997–2002. Elected in 1981, reelected in 1986, 1988, 1997.

Senate of France

Senator of Haut-Rhin : 2004–2007 (Became secretary of State in 2007). Elected in 2004. Reelected in 2008, but he stays minister.

General Council

General councillor of Haut-Rhin : 1982–1989 (Resignation) / 1994–1997 (Resignation). Reelected in 1988, 1994.

Municipal Council

Mayor of Mulhouse : 1989–2010 (Resignation). Reelected in 1995, 2001, 2008.

Municipal councillor of Mulhouse : Since 1989. Reelected in 1995, 2001, 2008.

Agglomeration community Council

President of the Agglomeration community of Mulhouse Sud Alsace : Since 2001. Reelected in 2008.

Member of the Agglomeration community of Mulhouse Sud Alsace : Since 2001. Reelected in 2008.

References

External links
 Official website of Modern Left
 Biography (in French) on the official Prime-Ministerial web site

1950 births
Living people
Politicians from Strasbourg
French people of German descent
Socialist Party (France) politicians
Modern Left politicians
Union of Democrats and Independents politicians
Radical Movement politicians
French Ministers of Commerce and Industry
Deputies of the 7th National Assembly of the French Fifth Republic
Deputies of the 8th National Assembly of the French Fifth Republic
Deputies of the 9th National Assembly of the French Fifth Republic
Deputies of the 11th National Assembly of the French Fifth Republic
French Senators of the Fifth Republic
Senators of Haut-Rhin